Jeff Hogg (born 15 October 1966) is a former Australian rules football player who played for Richmond and Fitzroy Football Clubs in the Victorian Football League (VFL) and the Australian Football League (AFL) between 1986 and 1996.

Nicknamed "Hedge", Hogg played with Richmond's junior teams, and was the Leading Goalkicker for Richmond's Under 19s premiership side in 1985. He made his senior VFL debut in 1986, and played at full forward, winning Richmond's Leading Goalkicker award in 1988, 1989, 1991, 1992 and 1993 and which included a 10-goal haul against Collingwood Football Club in 1991.

Hogg was traded to Fitzroy at the end of 1993 but due to ongoing injury problems, he was limited to 40 games in his three seasons at Fitzroy.

Career 
In 2002, Jeff started a company called "BizHealth Consultants"  in the corporate health field located in Melbourne, Australia, helping companies in providing a better and a healthy workplace in Australia.

References 

 Hogan P: The Tigers Of Old, Richmond FC, Melbourne 1996

External links
 
 

1966 births
Living people
Richmond Football Club players
Fitzroy Football Club players
Australian rules footballers from Victoria (Australia)
Place of birth missing (living people)
Victorian State of Origin players